Pacific Coast tick fever is an infection caused by Rickettsia philipii. The disease is spread by the Pacific coast ticks. Symptoms may include an eschar. It is within a group known as spotted fever rickettsiosis together with Rickettsia parkeri rickettsiosis, Rocky Mountain spotted fever, and rickettsialpox. These infections can be difficult to tell apart.

References

Rickettsioses
Bacterium-related cutaneous conditions
Zoonoses
Tick-borne diseases